Maoricolpus finlayi is a species of sea snail, a marine gastropod mollusc in the family Turritellidae. It is known to occur only in Spirits Bay,  North Island, New Zealand.

Description

Maoricolpus finlayi have stout shells with concave bases. The shells are pale in colour, and have a smal squarish pattern of dots.

Distribution
The species is Endemic to New Zealand. The holotype was collected from Piwhane / Spirits Bay, at the northern end of the Aupouri Peninsula in the Northland Region of New Zealand.

References

 Powell A. W. B., New Zealand Mollusca, William Collins Publishers Ltd, Auckland, New Zealand 1979 

Turritellidae
Gastropods of New Zealand
Gastropods described in 1940
Taxa named by Arthur William Baden Powell
Endemic fauna of New Zealand
Endemic molluscs of New Zealand